Raymond Case Kelly is an American cultural anthropologist and ethnologist who has written on the origin of warfare, and on the basis of social inequality in human societies.

Biography
Raymond C. Kelly was born February 16, 1942, in Bridgeport, Connecticut. He is the son of Helen Varkala Kelly and Rowland Leigh Kelly. Both attended the University of Chicago. He has two daughters by previous marriages.

He received his bachelor's degree from the University of Chicago in 1965 and his Ph.D. in anthropology from the University of Michigan in 1974. He taught at the University of Michigan for 33 years and retired in 2002.

His Ph.D. research was in Papua New Guinea, where he spent 16 months doing ethnographic research with the Etoro tribe. This research was the basis for many of his publications. He is the author of four books. He was elected to the National Academy of Sciences in 2005.

Selected publications
 
 (2000) Warless Societies and the Origin of War. Ann Arbor: University of Michigan Press.
 (1993) Constructing Inequality: The Fabrication of a Hierarchiy of Virtue Among the Etoro. Ann Arbor: University of Michigan Press.
 (1985) The Nuer Conquest: The Structure and Development of an Expansionist System. Ann Arbor: University of Michigan Press.
 (1977) Etoro Social Structure: A Study in Structural Contradiction. Ann Arbor: University of Michigan Press.

References

External links
(2005) "The Evolution of Lethal Intergroup Violence" PNAS Full text.

American anthropologists
American ethnologists
University of Chicago alumni
Living people
1942 births
Writers from Bridgeport, Connecticut
University of Michigan alumni
University of Michigan faculty
Members of the United States National Academy of Sciences